The 2015 Valencian Community motorcycle Grand Prix was the eighteenth and final round of the 2015 Grand Prix motorcycle racing season. It was held at the Circuit Ricardo Tormo in Valencia on 8 November 2015.

Background
This was the last race for Bridgestone, who had been the sole tyre supplier since 2009, as the sole tyre supplier in MotoGP, before they are replaced by Michelin for 2016. It was also the last race for the ART and Forward Yamaha bikes.
After a court trial involving Valentino Rossi's clash with Marc Márquez in the previous race, the FIM staff and CAS rejected Rossi's appeal of suspension of three penalty points given for purposely pushing Márquez wide, and declared that he would start the round from last place.

Race
Championship hopeful Jorge Lorenzo had taken pole position and took the start, and led from start to finish, closely shadowed by Honda duo Márquez and Dani Pedrosa, who were buffers preventing Rossi from reaching the second position he'd needed to become champion. Rossi fought up to fourth after being allowed to pass by numerous other riders, but had no prospect of catching any of the three top riders and so cruised home. Lorenzo was subject to heavy pressure by the Honda riders during the final lap, but held on to claim his third MotoGP and fifth overall title.

Classification

MotoGP

Moto2
Dominique Aegerter was replaced by Joshua Hook after the second practice session.

The first attempt to run the race was interrupted following an accident involving multiple riders in the opening lap. For the restart, the race distance was reduced from 27 to 18 laps.

Moto3

Championship standings after the race (MotoGP)
Below are the standings for the top five riders and constructors after round eighteen has concluded.

Riders' Championship standings

Constructors' Championship standings

 Note: Only the top five positions are included for both sets of standings.

References

Valencian
Valencian Motorcycle Grand Prix
Valencian Community motorcycle Grand Prix
21st century in Valencia
Valencian motorcycle Grand Prix